The Slate Covered Bridge is a wooden covered bridge which carries the Westport Village Road over the Ashuelot River in Westport, a village of Swanzey, New Hampshire.  The bridge was built in 2001, as a replacement for an 1862 bridge that was destroyed by arson fire in 1993.  The 1862 bridge, one of New Hampshire's small number of surviving 19th-century covered bridges, was listed on the National Register of Historic Places in 1978.

Description and history
The Slate Covered Bridge is located in southwestern Swanzey, carrying Westport Village Road (formerly an alignment of New Hampshire Route 10) over the Ashuelot River in a roughly north-south orientation. The bridge is a reproduction of the 1862 bridge. Its name derives from a family that lived nearby at the time of its construction. It rested on abutments of split granite, and was covered with a tin roof. Its sides were fully sheathed, and it had numerous repairs and parts replaced.

See also

National Register of Historic Places listings in Cheshire County, New Hampshire
List of bridges on the National Register of Historic Places in New Hampshire
List of New Hampshire covered bridges

References

External links
Slate Bridge, NH Division of Historical Resources

Covered bridges on the National Register of Historic Places in New Hampshire
Bridges completed in 2001
Wooden bridges in New Hampshire
Tourist attractions in Cheshire County, New Hampshire
Bridges in Cheshire County, New Hampshire
National Register of Historic Places in Cheshire County, New Hampshire
Swanzey, New Hampshire
Road bridges on the National Register of Historic Places in New Hampshire
Lattice truss bridges in the United States
Covered bridges in the United States destroyed by arson